The Oklahoma City Open Invitational was a golf tournament on the PGA Tour that played at various clubs in Oklahoma City. The tournament first played in the 1920s under the name Oklahoma City Open.

After a hiatus of nearly three decades, the PGA Tour returned to Oklahoma City in the 1950s. The 1962–1967 events were held at Quail Creek Golf & Country Club.

Tournament hosts

Winners

Notes

References

Former PGA Tour events
Golf in Oklahoma
Sports in Oklahoma City